Associazione Sportiva Dilettantistica Napoli Calcio a 5 is a futsal club based in Napoli, Campania, Italy.

Current squad

See also
S.S.C. Napoli

External links
Official Website
Divisione Calcio a 5

Futsal clubs in Italy
Sport in Campania
2000 establishments in Italy
Futsal clubs established in 2000